Nava is a Spanish surname. Notable people with the surname include:

 Abraham Nava (born 1964), Mexican football (soccer) player
 Angélina Nava, better known as simply Angelina (born 2006), French singer
 Antonia Nava de Catalán (1779–1843), heroine of the Mexican War of Independence
 Cesare Nava (1861–1933), Italian engineer and politician
 Daniel Nava (born 1983), American baseball player
 Eduardo Nava (born 1997), American tennis player
 Emilio Nava (born 2001), American tennis player
 Gregory Nava (born 1949), American film director
 Jackie Nava (born 1980), Mexican boxer
 José Francisco Nava (born 1983), Chilean pole vaulter
 Julian Nava (1927-2022), American diplomat and educator
 Mariella Nava (born 1960), Italian singer-songwriter
 Stefano Nava (born 1969), Italian footballer
 Thelma Nava (1932–2019), Mexican poet, magazine co-founder, publisher, journalist